{{Infobox television
| image              = 19-2 logo.jpg
| caption            =
| genre              = 
| based_on           = | developer          = Bruce M. Smith
| starring           = 
| composer           = Nicolas Maranda
| country            = Canada
| location           = Montreal, Quebec, Canada
| language           = English
| num_seasons        = 4
| num_episodes       = 38
| list_episodes      = 
| executive_producer = 
| runtime            = 42–45 minutes
| company            = 
| network            = 
| first_aired        = 
| last_aired         =  
}}19-2 is a Canadian police procedural crime drama television series developed by Bruce M. Smith, based on the Canadian French-language series of the same name created by Réal Bossé and Claude Legault. It was produced by Sphere Media Plus and Echo Media, in association with Bell Media; Smith served as showrunner. The series premiered on Bravo in Canada on January 29, 2014, and aired for three seasons, before it moved to CTV for its fourth and final season. It finished its four-year run on September 18, 2017, with 38 episodes.

Set in Montréal, 19-2 follows the professional and personal lives of patrol officers from the Montréal Police Service's Station 19, which covers an inner-city area of the City. The series' name comes from the callsign of the patrol car of the two main characters. Adrian Holmes and Jared Keeso star as Nick Barron and Ben Chartier. The two are joined by principal cast members Benz Antoine, Mylène Dinh-Robic, Laurence Leboeuf, Dan Petronijevic, Conrad Pla, Bruce Ramsay, Sarah Allen, Victor Cornfoot, Tyler Hynes and Maxim Roy, with Richard Chevolleau, Lisa Berry, Tattiawna Jones, Alexander De Jordy, Krista Bridges, Joe Pingue, and Darcy Laurie joining them in later seasons.19-2 has received positive reviews from critics, with particular praise for its characterization, pacing, writing, and acting. The series has been nominated for 37 Canadian Screen Awards, winning five, including Best Dramatic Series and Best Performance by an Actor for both Holmes and Keeso, and was also nominated for Best Drama Series at the 44th International Emmy Awards.

Series overview
Nick Barron and his partner Jean-Pierre Harvey are shot responding to a burglary. While Barron is spared by his body armour, Harvey is shot in the head and left hospitalized for life. Replacing Harvey is Ben Chartier, a veteran constable from the Sûreté du Québec (SQ), who transferred to Montreal to escape troubles in his hometown. As officers from Station 19 deal with the challenges of police work, they struggle with their own personal challenges as well. Chartier is estranged from his family after he personally arrests his own father for drunk driving. Barron struggles with his continuing feelings for his estranged wife, colleague Detective Isabelle Latendresse. Tyler Joseph struggles with alcoholism. Jean-Marc Brouillard abuses his wife. Commander Marcel Gendron struggles to protect the station's image in the face of pressure from the public and his superiors alike. By the end of the first season, Chartier's former employer, the SQ, assigns him to find a mole within the station.

The second season begins with Barron and Chartier responding to reports of a snake at a daycare centre. Chartier encounters an armed civilian: Barron's cousin Cassius Clemont. Barron's unsavoury relationship with Clemont makes Barron the prime suspect of the SQ's investigation into the mole in 19. When Chartier brings Barron into the investigation, Barron and Clemont burgle a suspect's house and make a rash decision that endangers both of them. The third season starts in the aftermath of the mole's suicide. The reputation of Station 19 has been destroyed by the revelation of the mole, along with other incidents such as the arrest of Brouillard for domestic violence. Cassie Clemont is discovered dead, having been brutally tortured for days. Barron and Chartier must deal with the fallout of Barron's actions, as the station is scrutinized by an inspector from Internal Affairs.

The series features a fourth season that was not based on the 2011 French version and is completely original, containing 8 additional episodes.

Cast and characters

Main
 Adrian Holmes as Nick Barron
 Jared Keeso as Ben Chartier
 Benz Antoine as Tyler "Big Dog" Joseph
 Mylène Dinh-Robic as Beatrice "Bear" Hamelin
 Laurence Leboeuf as Audrey Pouliot
 Dan Petronijevic as Jean-Marc "J.M." Brouillard
 Conrad Pla as Julien Houle (seasons 1–2; guest seasons 3–4)
 Bruce Ramsay as Marcel Gendron 
 Sarah Allen as Catherine Lariviere (season 1; guest season 2)
 Victor Cornfoot as Jean-Pierre Harvey (season 1; guest seasons 2 & 4)
 Tyler Hynes as Vince Legare (seasons 1–2)
 Maxim Roy as Isabelle Latendresse (seasons 1–2; guest seasons 3–4)
 Richard Chevolleau as Cassius "Kaz" Clemont (season 2; guest seasons 3–4)
 Lisa Berry as Rita George (season 2; guest season 3)
 Tattiawna Jones as Amelie de Grace (seasons 2–3; recurring season 1; guest season 4)
 Alexander De Jordy as Richard Dulac (seasons 3–4; guest season 2)
 Krista Bridges as Elise Roberge (season 3; guest season 4)
 Joe Pingue as Charlie Figo (season 3)
 Darcy Laurie as Roy Suarez (season 4; recurring season 3)

Recurring
 Zackaryer Abdillahi as Theo Barron
 Andreas Apergis as Dispatcher (voice)
 Catherine Bérubé as Laura
 Mark Camacho as Dougas
 Juliette Gosselin as Martine
 Danny Blanco Hall as Girard
 Jayne Heitmeyer as Marie
 Paul Hopkins as Jim Bouchard
 Vincent Leclerc as Anthony Tremblay
 Anthony Lemke as Dan Malloy
 Spiro Malandrakis as Frank Ferney
 Margot Claire Mustos as Sandrine
 Neil Napier as Jerry Lowe
 Aiza Ntibarikure as Roxanne Dionne (season 4)
 Alexandra Ordolis as Justine
 Leni Parker as Pilcher
 Jennifer Seguin as Dispatcher (voice)
 Sagine Sémajuste as Farah Miller
 Linda Smith as Ben's mom
 Jaa Smith-Johnson as Christos
 Christian Tessier as Marc Chartier
 Vlasta Vrana as Ben's father

Episodes

Season 1 (2014)

Season 2 (2015)

Season 3 (2016)

Season 4 (2017)

Production

Development
In July 2012, CBC Television ordered a pilot for an English-language adaptation of the popular French-language television series 19-2 created by and starring Réal Bossé and Claude Legault, to be adapted by Bruce M. Smith and directed by Louis Choquette. CBC Television did not pick up the series for its 2013 season; instead, the adapted series was picked up by Bravo for a season of ten episodes in June 2013 at the Banff World Media Festival, with Smith serving as showrunner. The series was renewed for a second season in April 2014, a third in April 2015, and a fourth in May 2016. On September 23, 2016, Bell Media announced that the fourth season would be the show's final season. The series had a $500,000 per episode budget bump over the original series.

Casting
In August 2012, Adrian Holmes and Jared Keeso were cast as Nick Barron and Ben Chartier, respectively. In September 2013, Bravo announced that Benz Antoine would reprise his role as Tyler Joseph from the original series, with Maxim Roy, Laurence Leboeuf, Dan Petronijevic, Mylène Dinh-Robic, Conrad Pla, and Bruce Ramsay cast as Detective Isabelle Latendresse, Audrey Pouliot, J.M. Brouillard, Beatrice Hamelin, Sergeant Julien Houle, and District Commander Marcel Gendron, respectively. Additional cast include Sarah Allen as Catherine Lariviere, Victor Cornfoot as Jean-Pierre Harvey, and Tyler Hynes as Vince Legare. In July 2014, Richard Chevolleau and Lisa Berry joined the cast for the second season as Cassius "Kaz" Clemont and Rita George, respectively. Tattiawna Jones, who recurred as Amelie de Grace, throughout the first season, was subsequently promoted to the principal cast in the second season. In August 2015, Alexander De Jordy was announced to be cast as Richard Dulac, while Krista Bridges was announced as Inspector Elise Roberge, and Joe Pingue as Charlie Figo. Darcy Laurie joined the cast for the fourth season as Sergeant Roy Suarez.

Filming
Filming for the series took place in Montreal, primarily at a decommissioned police station. 
On the show filming in Montreal, executive producer Jocelyn Deschênes stated, "CBC said – 'We want to see Montreal'. They asked for it. Montreal hasn't been shown that much on English-Canadian TV and it's a very cinematic city. They really want us to show Montreal from angles that we've never seen." Production on the pilot took place at the end of September 2012, for ten days, while production on the remaining episodes began in September 2013, and concluded in December.

Production on the second season began in July 2014 until October. The season two premiere, "School", features an uninterrupted, 13-minute single-camera tracking shot of a school shooting, based on the 2006 Dawson College shooting in Montreal. Podz, director of the French-Canadian version of the show who had helmed the school-shooting episode in that series, was brought back to helm the episode of the English-Canadian adaptation. The scene, which was shot in the same school as the original, involved intense research and rehearsal, at least a half-dozen rooms, a two-storey building, roughly a hundred extras, and required thirteen takes. Production on the third season began in August 2015, while filming for the fourth and final season began in September 2016. Filming for the series ended in December 2016.

Release

Broadcast19-2 aired on Bravo in Canada, for its first three seasons, each consisting of 10 episodes, before it moved to CTV for its fourth and final season, consisting of eight episodes. The first season originally aired from January 29 to April 2, 2014, while the second season aired from January 19 to March 23, 2015. A third season premiered on June 20, 2016, concluding on August 22, and the fourth season premiered on July 31, 2017, and concluded on September 18.

Content Television & Digital bought the international distribution rights in January 2014. In the United States, the series began streaming on Acorn TV, with the first season premiering on January 18, 2016, the second on May 16, the third on October 24, and the fourth on September 22, 2017. In the United Kingdom, Season 1 premiered on Spike UK on July 15, 2015; and Season 2 on July 6, 2016. In Latin America distribution, Kew Media sold three seasons of the series to Grey Juice Lab in 2018, for broadcast rights in Chile, Argentina and the Dominican Republic.

Home media
The complete first season was first released on DVD in Region 1 on April 26, 2016, with the complete second season released on August 30, 2016, the complete third season released on December 13, 2016, and the complete fourth season is scheduled to be released on November 7, 2017. CraveTV has exclusive Canadian streaming rights to the series, with all episodes available on the video on demand service and new episodes of the fourth season available one day earlier, 10 p.m. on Sunday, than their original broadcast on CTV, beginning on July 30, 2017. Episodes of the first three seasons were available on Bravo.ca, and the Bravo GO app after their broadcast premiere.

Reception

Audience viewership
The premiere episode of 19-2 was watched by 140,000 viewers, making it Bravo's most-watched premiere of an original Canadian series since The Borgias in 2011. Its conventional television debut aired on CTV the following day on January 30, 2014, and was watched by 872,000 viewers. The second episode was watched by a mere 76,000 viewers, which was attributed to many viewers who watched the premiere on CTV assuming the main network was its home. Due to this, Bell Media decided to air a second "special primetime" broadcast of the second episode on February 9, which led to a series-high for the show's third airing on Bravo, with 178,000 viewers tuning in. Regarding Bell Media's cross-platform promotion, Scott Henderson concluded, "It shows that the sampling works. It may have taken a few weeks to find the home, but now the series is doing well." After factoring DVR recordings, the second episode on Bravo was watched by a total of 150,000 viewers, up 96 percent from the preliminary data.

The first season finished as Bravo's number one new series of the 2014–15 television season, drawing an average of nearly 200,000 viewers per episode, and reaching a total of 3 million unique viewers. The second season grew its timeslot audience, 10 p.m. on Monday, by 54 percent compared to the same weeks in the previous year and over the course of the season reached a total of 2.5 million viewers.

Critical response
In a review for HuffPost Canada Denette Wilford wrote: "19-2 is not just your average procedural. It's a character-driven drama that follows two not-so-different men from very different worlds as they learn to work with one another. The acting is solid and organic, the pace is perfect, the writing is real and natural and believable, and the stories hit home." A.R. Wilson of Digital Journal also reviewed it positively saying, "Instead of depending on constant action sequences and endless doses of adrenaline, it spaces its major crimes out, patiently mining the aftermaths of these events for compelling storylines... It's realistically written, beautifully acted, and gorgeously shot in and around Montreal. Most of all, it's a keenly observed character drama that manages to make the cop show genre feel fresh by placing people over procedural."

Phil Harrison and Gwilym Mumford for The Guardian said "This Canadian series, set in Montréal's Precinct 19, boasts all the tropes of post-Shield police dramas: antiheroes, mavericks, shaky verité camerawork. Yet what 19-2 lacks in originality it makes up for in action from the off". The New York Timess Neil Genzlinger described the series as "a slow burn" and stated, "There are tropes in 19-2 – the police genre is too crowded for there not to be – but the writing is sublime, turning each episode into a sort of tone poem, a slice of urban and police life carefully observed. The series is in the tradition of shows like The Wire, portraying law enforcement less flashily and less noisily than others, and thus more accurately." Bill Brownstein of the Montreal Gazette said, "19-2 works so effectively because it grasps the reality of both conflicted cops and citizens in this city. Nothing is black and white here. Characters come in a variety of shades. All of which makes the chemistry between partners Barron and Chartier so credible and so captivating." Conversely, The Globe and Mails John Doyle was more critical of the series, feeling "the set-up is as plain as a poke in your eye", noting "The series flirts with grimness but points to the timidity of Canadian drama at the moment – its limitations and inability to challenge and horrify as well as entertain. Both Adrian Holmes and Jared Keeso are fine, it's the material that is less soulful and nuanced than it seems."

Nancy deWolf Smith of The Wall Street Journal praised the season two premiere, "School", calling it "the most agonizingly realistic sequence imaginable of a mass shooting and the close-action chase after an active shooter." She added, "Something about the setting, and the differences – even subtle ones – in the way Canadians approach issues such as race, sex, gender and justice, also makes 19-2 exciting in a wholly new way." Wilford also applauded the season two opener and wrote, "Look, every hour of 19-2'' is quality television and, at times, it can be a little too sombre. The premiere is like nothing you've ever seen, from the way it was shot, to every actor involved, to the subject matter... It's a powerful, compelling, exhausting hour – one that definitely should not be missed."

Accolades

Notes

References

General references

Further reading

External links
  (CTV archive)
   (Bravo archive)
 
 
 19-2 on Crave
 19-2 on Acorn TV

2014 Canadian television series debuts
2017 Canadian television series endings
2010s Canadian crime drama television series
2010s Canadian LGBT-related drama television series
Canadian action television series
Canadian police procedural television series
English-language television shows
Television shows filmed in Montreal
Television shows set in Montreal
Television series by Bell Media
CTV Television Network original programming
CTV Drama Channel original programming
Gemini and Canadian Screen Award for Best Drama Series winners